Osh Bazaar is one of the largest bazaars in Bishkek, Kyrgyzstan.  It is located on the west side of town, and is not far from the Western Bus Station.

At Osh Bazaar, one can buy food products, almost any common household good, clothes, souvenirs, and even musical instruments.  Kyrgyz national clothes are sold in the national goods section, called "Kyyal" ( - "fantasy/dream"), and may be special ordered (for size, colour, etc.) through the bazaar vendors.  The national goods section also includes vendors who sell carved wooden trunks, national bedding, national cradles, small souvenirs, and many other locally produced items relevant to the traditional and modern culture of Kyrgyzstan.

See also
 Bazaar
 Dordoy Bazaar
 Market (place)
 Retail
 Souq

Retail markets in Bishkek
Bazaars